The pigo (Rutilus pigus) is a species of freshwater fish in the roach genus Rutilus of the family Cyprinidae. The fish is native to northern Italy and Switzerland. It inhabits subalpine lakes of the northern Adriatic basin from the Livenza to the Po drainage, including Lakes Maggiore, Lugano, and Como.

Rutilus pigus has been termed the Danube roach.  The Danube drainage is not inhabited by R. pigus in the strict sense above, however. That region is inhabited by the closely related Rutilus virgo ("cactus roach"), which until recently was considered to be the same species as R. pigus, or its subspecies R.np. virgo. R. virgo is widespread from the Iron Gate upstream.

References

pigus
Cyprinid fish of Europe
Fish described in 1803
Taxonomy articles created by Polbot